Karl Volkmer (born 20 March 1922) is a Swiss former sprinter. He competed in the men's 4 × 400 metres relay at the 1948 Summer Olympics. Volkmer turned 100 in March 2022.

References

External links
 

1922 births
Living people
Swiss centenarians
Athletes (track and field) at the 1948 Summer Olympics
Swiss male sprinters
Swiss male middle-distance runners
Olympic athletes of Switzerland
Sportspeople from Basel-Stadt
Men centenarians